Saat Pake Bandha is a Bengali romantic film starring Soumitra Chatterjee, Suchitra Sen, Pahari Sanyal and Tarun Kumar. Directed by Ajoy Kar, it was a box office success upon its release. The movie was remade in 1963 in Telugu as Vivaha Bandham, in 1974 in Hindi as Kora Kagaz and in Tamil as Lalitha in 1976.

Plot
Professor Sukhendu Dutta (Soumitra Chatterjee), a well-educated poor orphan, who lives with his aunt in a small apartment in Kolkata. Along with the regular job in the university, he also
earns his living by private tuition. He met Archana Basu (Suchitra Sen), a well-educated woman of rich family background in a private party thrown in honour of a student of Sukhendu.
After that, they fell in love and got married. Archana's mother was not happy with the marriage from the beginning, considering the poor income of Sukhendu. Eventually her too
much interference in the married life of Sukhendu and Archana led to a mutual separation.

Cast
 Soumitra Chatterjee as Sukhendu Dutta
 Suchitra Sen as Archana Basu
 Pahari Sanyal as Archana's Father
 Chhaya Devi as Archana's Mother
 Molina Devi as Sukhendu's Aunt

Awards
Moscow International Film Festival
Silver Prize for Best Actress: Suchitra Sen
 11th National Film Awards – Saat Pake Bandha received a Certificate of Merit for 2nd best film in Bengali

References

External links

1963 films
Bengali-language Indian films
Films scored by Hemant Kumar
Films based on short fiction
Bengali films remade in other languages
1960s Bengali-language films
Films directed by Ajoy Kar
Films based on works by Ashutosh Mukhopadhyay